"Que Vuelvas" (English: "Come Back") is a song by Dominican singer Anthony Santos. The song was released on June 28, 2018. It served as the first single for Anthony's twenty-third studio album La Historia De Mi Vida: El Final, Vol. 1 (2018). The title of the song originally did not have the letter "s" when it was released as a single, which meant the song was titled as "Que Vuelva". Then when the album was released, the letter "s" was added to the title, thus renaming it "Que Vuelvas".

Charts

References

2018 singles
Spanish-language songs